Bullet is the nineteenth book in the Anita Blake: Vampire Hunter series of horror/mystery/erotica novels by Laurell K. Hamilton. It debuted at #2 on The New York Times Best Seller List for Hardcover Fiction.

Plot introduction
Anita Blake is back in St. Louis and trying to live a normal life-as normal as possible for someone who is a legal vampire executioner and a U.S. Marshal. There are lovers, friends and their children, school programs to attend. In the midst of all the ordinary happiness a vampire from Anita's past reaches out. She was supposed to be dead, killed in an explosion, but the Mother of All Darkness is the first vampire, their dark creator. It's hard to kill a god. This dark goddess has reached out to her here in St. Louis, home of everyone Anita loves most. The Mother of All Darkness has decided she has to act now or never, to control Anita, and all the vampires in America.

The Mother of All Darkness believes that the triumvirate created by master vampire Jean-Claude with Anita and the werewolf Richard Zeeman has enough power for her to regain a body and to immigrate to the New World. But the body she wants to possess is already taken. Anita is about to learn a whole new meaning to sharing her body, one that has nothing to do with the bedroom. And if the Mother of All Darkness can't succeed in taking over Anita's body for herself, she means to see that no one else has the use of it, ever again. Even Belle Morte, not always a friend to Anita, has sent word: "Run if you can..."

Characters in Bullet

Major characters
Anita Blake
Jean-Claude
Asher
Richard
Micah
Nathaniel

Other characters
Damian
Nicky, one-eyed werelion, a "Bride" of Anita's rather than an Animal-to-call, he is completely loyal to her because of being deep rolled by Anita in Flirt
Haven, a would-be werelion Rex to Anita's Regina, violent and very possessive of her in front of other werelions.

References

2010 American novels
American erotic novels
American horror novels
American mystery novels
Anita Blake: Vampire Hunter novels
Novels set in St. Louis
Berkley Books books